Milagros Correch (born 1991, Villa Urquiza, Buenos Aires), better known as Milu Correch, is an Argentine painter and muralist recognized internationally for her large scale murals and illustrations. Her work can be found in cities in Argentina and around the world.

Career

2011-2012 
Correch began her career as an artist in 2011 painting a street mural in Buenos Aires as she saw her home town getting filled with murals and fell in love with the format. She attended a workshop to learn the basic skills of mural painting led by Emy Mariani and Lean Frizzera, two Argentinian street artists from Buenos Aires. From the beginning, she decided to signe her works with her full name instead of using a pseudonym.

2013 
The following year, Correch collaborated in CULM: Construir un Lugar Mejor Sin Destruir Lo que Tenemos (in English: Building a better place without destructing what we have), a project founded by Santiago Gonzales Villagos that aimed to disseminate urban street art by regenerating landscapes and to bring visibility to the town of Quintanar de la Orden in Toledo, Spain. The thematic of the project was Don Quijote de La Mancha as to represent and tribute the identity of the municipality derived from Cervantes' story.

Correch's participation on the project resulted in the immense mural of Dulcinea del Toboso, the character that symbolizes Don Quijote's motive for all his knight-errant adventures. She decided to portray Dulcinea as the main event, supporting Don Quijote and Sancho Panza on one shoulder, and three mills interpreting La Mancha on the other. The production of the mural took six days in August 2013. This was the first big mural painted by Correch and measured approximately 20x15 meters tall. It is also the biggest illustration of Dulcinea in the world.

In September 2013, Correch painted another mural for CULM, this time in El Toboso, a town 7 kilometers away from Quintanar de la Orden, where she had created Dulcinea Sueña la Mancha on the town's water tower.

2014-2016 
In 2015, Correch painted the mural Disciples of Peter Pan - superagent children redeeming adults of the absurd, as part of aDNA collective in Rome, Italy. That same year, Correch exhibited original drawings and prints for two days at Bistro in Pigneto, Rome, Italy which was also curated by aDNA Collective. Her work was for sale in order to support her third trip in Europe since she was invited to create murals in various cities of Spain, Germany and Belgium.

In 2016, in addition to painting murals in Buenos Aires, she also painted in Sweden and Italy.

2017 
Her mural Oxido in the neighbourhood of Los Alamos, Quilmes, realized for the project Pinta tu barrio, was recognized as one of the seven best murals in the world for the month of November 2017, by Netherlands' Street Art Today. This mural was part of Entre Cenizas (in English: Among ashes) Correch's first exposition.

Correch was invited to participate to CURA - Circuito URbano de Arte in December 2017, to create a large scale mural that would mark the 120th anniversary of the city of Belo Horizonte, Brazil. The mural entitled Ajo y Vino illustrates two masked naked women dancing around bottles of wine, and being surrounded by crows. The background of the artwork was painted by three Brazilian pixadores: DIC, DOXS and PAVOR. The piece is found on the facade of the Garagem Sao Jose, a 28-story building which is now part of one of the tallest murals in Latin America, covering a surface of 1,750 square meters.

Ajo y Vino also marked the first mural of Correch's witches series:

“I’m beginning a new series of ‘witches’- before capitalism and witch-burning, women had the wisdom of healing, controlling their reproductivity, etc… but were hunted for a centralization of the power and the expansion of population for capitalist benefits. First in Europe, and then in America with less success. My intention is to represent these dynamic women that were tracked down because they were considered a threat to the system. Not for consumption of marriage as a bride, but because of this ethereal connection with nature and inner-spirituality. Another aspect of witches I find fascinating is that in fairy tales they’re the only character not defined by a man, and are key figures to provide the main element of action or controversy in fables.” - Milu Correch.

2018 
In 2018, she participated in Draw The Line, the International Festival of Graffiti and Street Art in Campobasso, Italy painting a mural in homage to Hecate, Goddess of Witches.

Continuing the witches series, Correch painted two murals at the NuArt Aberdeen Festival in Scotland: Conjuro contra la corona and Después del Aquelarre. Both represent the oppression of women persecuted for witchcraft or sorcery in the late 16th and early 17th century. Correch paints the woman in both murals using dark colours and covering their faces as to create somber hidden subjects that reflect the neglect of women's rights and the dehumanization of witches.

Artwork

Murals 
Her murals are painted with techniques such as layouts, pain rollers, paint brushes, grids and projectors. The themes of her works are mainly focused around mythological and anthropomorphic figures in which classic and ancient Latin American iconographies merge with characters from modern myths.

References

External links 
 https://www.facebook.com/milucorrechoficial/?ref=page_internal
 https://www.instagram.com/milucorrech/
 https://www.milucorrech.com/

1991 births
Living people
21st-century Argentine women artists
Argentine muralists
Argentine women illustrators
Artists from Buenos Aires